Russell Dana Feingold (born March 2, 1953) is an American lawyer and politician who served as a United States Senator from Wisconsin from 1993 to 2011. A member of the Democratic Party, he was its nominee in the 2016 election for the same U.S. Senate seat he had previously occupied. From 1983 to 1993, he was a Wisconsin State Senator representing the 27th District.

With John McCain, Feingold received the 1999 John F. Kennedy Profile in Courage Award. He and McCain cosponsored the Bipartisan Campaign Reform Act (McCain–Feingold Act), a major piece of campaign finance reform legislation. He was the only senator to vote against the Patriot Act during the first vote on the legislation.

Feingold was mentioned as a possible candidate in the 2008 presidential election, but in November 2006 announced he would not run. In 2010, Feingold lost his campaign for reelection to the U.S. Senate to Republican nominee Ron Johnson. On June 18, 2013, he was selected by Secretary of State John Kerry to replace R. Barrie Walkley as a special envoy to the Great Lakes region of Africa.

On May 14, 2015, Feingold announced his candidacy for his old Senate seat in 2016. He was defeated by Johnson in a rematch of their 2010 Senate race. In 2020, Feingold became president of the American Constitution Society.

Early life, education, and career
Feingold was born in Janesville, Wisconsin, to a Jewish family. His grandparents were immigrants from Russia and Galicia. His father, Leon Feingold (1912–1980), was an attorney; his mother, Sylvia Feingold (née Binstock; 1918–2005), worked at a title company. Feingold was one of four children. Feingold's father and his older brother David, a Vietnam War conscientious objector, were the major influences on his political development as a youth. As a boy he was also involved with the B'nai B'rith Youth Organization and Aleph Zadik Aleph.

In 1972, Feingold volunteered for the presidential campaign of New York City mayor John Lindsay. He later supported the presidential campaigns of Mo Udall and Ted Kennedy.

After graduating from Joseph A. Craig High School, Feingold attended the University of Wisconsin–Madison and graduated in 1975 with a Bachelor of Arts degree with honors in political science. He was a member of the Phi Beta Kappa honor society and was inducted into the Iron Shield Society, which is considered the highest honor achievable by University of Wisconsin-Madison undergraduate students. Feingold then went to Magdalen College at the University of Oxford on a Rhodes Scholarship, where he graduated in 1977 with a first-class honours Bachelor of Arts in Jurisprudence. Upon returning to the U.S., he attended Harvard Law School, receiving his J.D. with honors in 1979.

Feingold worked as an attorney at the private law firms of Foley & Lardner and La Follette & Sinykin from 1979 until 1985.

Wisconsin Senate
In 1982, Feingold was elected to the Wisconsin Senate, where he served for ten years until his election to the United States Senate. After he was elected to the United States Senate, Feingold was succeeded in the state senate by Joe Wineke.

U.S. Senate

Elections

1992 

Feingold's senatorial career began in 1992 with a victory over incumbent Republican Senator Bob Kasten. Feingold had little name recognition in the state and was campaigning in a primary against Congressman Jim Moody and businessman Joe Checota, but adopted several proposals to gain the electorate's attention. He painted five promises on his garage door, calling it a contract with Wisconsin voters. Among Feingold's promises was a pledge to rely on Wisconsin citizens for most of his contributions and a pledge to hold a "listening session" in each of Wisconsin's 72 counties each year he was in office.

Feingold released an advertisement featuring an Elvis Presley impersonator endorsing his candidacy. His Republican opponent, Bob Kasten, responded to the ad with one of his own featuring another Elvis impersonator attacking Feingold's record.

During the primary campaign, Feingold unveiled an 82-point plan that aimed to eliminate the deficit by the end of his first term. The plan called for a raise in taxes and cuts in the defense budget, among other things, and was derided as "extremist" by Republicans and "too liberal" by his Democratic opponents. Feingold also announced his support for strict campaign finance reform and a national health care system and voiced his opposition to term limits and new tax cuts.

Feingold won by positioning himself as a quirky underdog who offered voters an alternative to what was seen by many as negative campaigning of opponents Jim Moody and Joe Checota. On primary day, Feingold, who had polled in the single digits during much of the campaign, won 70% of the vote. Seven weeks later, while Bill Clinton, George H. W. Bush, and Ross Perot split the Wisconsin presidential vote 41%-37%-21%, Feingold beat Kasten, 53% to 46%.

1998 

During his 1998 reelection campaign, Feingold was outspent by his Republican opponent, Representative Mark Neumann, and targeted by the National Republican Senatorial Committee. Feingold placed a cap on his own fundraising, pledging not to raise or spend more than $3.8 million (one dollar for every citizen of Wisconsin) during the campaign, and turning away Democratic Party soft money. He requested that several lobby groups, including the AFL–CIO and the League of Conservation Voters, refrain from airing pro-Feingold "issue ads". Some Democrats were angry at Feingold for "putting his career at risk" with these self-imposed limits. Neumann also limited himself to $3.8 million in spending, but allowed soft money to be used in his favor by outside groups. A strong showing in the Democratic strongholds of Milwaukee and Madison allowed Feingold to win the election by about two percentage points.

2004 

In the 2004 Senate election, Feingold defeated the Republican candidate, businessman Tim Michels, by 11 percentage points (55%-44%), earning a third term. During the campaign, Feingold refrained from imposing spending caps on himself as he had in the past, and raised and spent almost $11 million. In 2004, Feingold spent nearly $3.7 million, or about 67%, more than his opponent. PolitiFact.com rated Feingold's frequent assertion that he had been outspent by opponents in every U.S. Senate election "pants on fire."

In late December 2004, Feingold was appointed to be one of four deputy whips for the Senate Democrats.

2010 

Feingold was defeated for reelection on November 2, 2010, by Oshkosh businessman Ron Johnson, 52% to 47%.

2016 

On May 14, 2015, Feingold announced his candidacy for U.S. Senate against the incumbent, Republican Ron Johnson.

In his 2016 campaign, Feingold said he would no longer adhere to his longstanding pledge to raise the majority of his campaign funds from Wisconsin residents. Feingold said the pledge had been made on an election-to-election basis and no longer made sense. As of March 2016, Feingold had raised the most money among all U.S. Senate candidates challenging an incumbent. Nearly three-fourths of his individual contributions were from outside Wisconsin.

Groups financially supporting Feingold's election bid included Planned Parenthood, the League of Conservation Voters, American Bridge 21st Century, and the National Abortion Rights Action League. In May 2016, Senator Bernie Sanders endorsed Feingold and engaged in fundraising for him.

In the November 8, 2016, general election, Feingold was defeated by Johnson. Feingold received slightly less than 47%, and Johnson received slightly more than 50%, of the vote.

Committee assignments
 Committee on the Budget
 Committee on the Judiciary
 Subcommittee on Administrative Oversight and the Courts
 Subcommittee on the Constitution (Chairman)
 Subcommittee on Crime and Drugs
 Committee on Foreign Relations
 Subcommittee on Near Eastern and South and Central Asian Affairs
 Subcommittee on African Affairs (Chairman)
 Subcommittee on East Asian and Pacific Affairs
 Subcommittee on International Operations and Organizations, Democracy and Human Rights
 Select Committee on Intelligence

Tenure

During his time in the U.S. Senate, Feingold gained a reputation as a political maverick with an independent streak. When he broke with his own party, it was often because he was taking a more liberal or populist position than other Democrats. Throughout his congressional tenure, several ranking systems placed Feingold among the nation's most liberal or progressive senators.

During the impeachment trial of Bill Clinton, Feingold was the only Democratic senator to vote against a motion to dismiss Congress's impeachment case against President Bill Clinton. Feingold ultimately voted against conviction on all charges.

Feingold opposed NAFTA and numerous other free trade agreements.

In 2001, Feingold was the only senator to vote against the Patriot Act (H.R. 3162). Also in 2001, Feingold voted for the confirmation of Attorney General John Ashcroft.

On December 21, 2004, Feingold wrote an article for the website Salon about a golfing trip to Greenville, Alabama. After noting how friendly the people were, and that Wisconsin had many similar places, he expressed his sorrow that such a poverty-stricken area was "the reddest spot on the whole map" despite Republican policies that Feingold considered destructive to the well-being of the poor and middle class. Alabama Governor Bob Riley and Greenville Mayor Dexter McLendon, both Republicans, were perturbed at Feingold's description of "check-cashing stores and abject trailer parks, and some of the hardest-used cars for sale on a very rundown lot." McLendon invited Feingold back for a more complete tour of the city, and Feingold agreed. He visited the city on March 28, 2005, making amends and increasing speculation about his presidential plans for 2008.

In May 2006, Feingold voted in favor of bill S.2611, the Comprehensive Immigration Reform Act of 2006, an immigration reform bill that was designed to give most illegal immigrants a chance to become legal citizens.

Feingold co-sponsored a number of failed bills calling for the abolition of the death penalty.

In 2009, Feingold voted against confirmation of Timothy Geithner to be United States Secretary of the Treasury, citing Geithner's personal tax issues. Also in 2009, Feingold announced that he was planning to introduce a constitutional amendment that would prohibit governors from making temporary Senate appointments instead of holding special elections.

Feingold cosponsored the Veterans Health Care Budget Reform and Transparency Act, which was signed into law in October 2009.

Campaign finance reform
Feingold is perhaps best known for his work with Senator John McCain on the Bipartisan Campaign Reform Act of 2002, better known as the McCain–Feingold Act. The legislation, which took seven years to pass, became defunct in the wake of several U.S. Supreme Court decisions.

Wall Street reform
On May 20, 2010, Feingold was one of two Democratic senators to vote against the Dodd–Frank Wall Street reform bill, citing his belief that the measures did not go far enough. On July 15, 2010, he became the only Democratic senator to vote against the bill when it was brought up again; it passed by a 60-39 vote.

Patriot Act

Feingold was the only senator to vote against the Patriot Act when it was first introduced in 2001, saying that its provisions infringed upon citizens' civil liberties.

When the bill was up for renewal in late December 2005, Feingold led a bipartisan coalition of senators – including Lisa Murkowski, Ken Salazar, Larry Craig, Dick Durbin and John Sununu  – to remove some of the act's more controversial provisions. Feingold led a filibuster against renewal of the act. In February 2006, the Senate voted 96-3 to break the filibuster and to extend the Patriot Act.

In 2009, when the act was again up for reauthorization, Feingold introduced the JUSTICE Act (S. 1686) "To place reasonable safeguards on the use of surveillance and other authorities under the USA PATRIOT Act." Senator Patrick Leahy then introduced an alternative bill, about which Feingold later said "...while narrower than the JUSTICE Act that Senator Durbin and I have championed, [it] did contain several important and necessary protections for the privacy of innocent Americans." After what Feingold saw as the further watering down of civil liberty protections in the bill, it passed out of the Senate Judiciary Committee on October 8 by a vote of 11 to 8 with Feingold voting against it.

War in Iraq
Feingold was one of 23 senators to vote against H.J. Resolution 114, which authorized President George W. Bush to use force against Iraq in 2002.

On August 17, 2005, he became the first senator to call for the withdrawal of troops from Iraq and urge that a timetable for that withdrawal be set. He called other Democrats "timid" for refusing to take action sooner, and suggested December 31, 2006, as the date for total withdrawal of troops. On the subject of Bush's assertion that a deadline would be helpful to Iraqi insurgents, Feingold said, "I think he's wrong. I think not talking about endgames is playing into our enemies' hand."

On April 27, 2006, Feingold announced that he would move to amend an appropriations bill granting $106.5 billion in emergency spending measure for Iraq and Hurricane Katrina relief to require that troops withdraw completely from Iraq.

Call for a vote of censure against President Bush
On March 14, 2006, Feingold introduced a resolution in the Senate to censure President Bush. This was a result of allegations of illegal wiretapping under the Foreign Intelligence Surveillance Act of 1978 (FISA), which mandates use of a surveillance court for approval of wiretaps on Americans. Feingold made a 25-minute speech on the Senate floor, declaring that Congress must "hold the president accountable for his actions". It received support from Senators Tom Harkin of Iowa and Barbara Boxer of California, but most Democratic senators avoided expressing an opinion on it. Senators John Kerry of Massachusetts and Patrick Leahy of Vermont expressed support for the bill, but Feingold was able to find only three co-sponsors.

Feingold again called for Bush's censure in July 2007 for his management of the Iraq war, accusing him of mounting an "assault" against the United States Constitution.

Health care policy

Feingold supports the creation of a system of universal health care in America. During his first run for the Senate, he endorsed the single-payer model, in which the government pays for all healthcare costs.

On July 24, 2006, at a press conference at the Martin Luther King Heritage Health Center in Milwaukee, Wisconsin, Feingold announced that he had authored the State-Based Health Care Reform Act, a bill to create a pilot program for a system of universal healthcare under which each U.S. state would create a program to provide its citizenry with universal health insurance and the federal government would provide the funding. The bill would create a nonpartisan "Health Care Reform Task Force," which would provide five-year federal grants to two or three states. The program was expected to cost $32 billion over 10 years.

Feingold voted for the Patient Protection and Affordable Care Act that passed the Senate on December 24, 2009.

Gun policy
Feingold has voted in favor of certain gun-control legislation while also voting to expand certain gun rights. He signed the congressional amicus brief in District of Columbia v. Heller, the U.S. Supreme Court case that overturned a handgun ban in Washington, D.C.

Feingold has voted in favor of bills to require background checks for handgun buyers, to require background checks for firearms purchases at gun shows, and to require that handguns be sold with trigger locks. He supported President Barack Obama's 2016 executive orders to expand background checks and strengthen enforcement of existing gun laws.

Social issues
Feingold supports abortion rights.

In 1996, Feingold was in a minority of legislators who voted against the Defense of Marriage Act, which President Bill Clinton signed into law. In an April 4, 2006 interview, Feingold announced that he favored the legalization of same-sex marriage.

On May 18, 2006, Feingold walked out of a meeting of the Senate Judiciary Committee shortly before a vote on a constitutional amendment to ban same-sex marriage. Feingold objected to both the amendment and decision of Chairman Arlen Specter (R-PA at the time) to move the meeting to an area of the Capitol Building not open to the public. Later that day, the committee voted to send the amendment to the full Senate.

2008 possible presidential bid

In late January 2005, Feingold told the Tiger Bay Club of Volusia County, Florida that he intended to travel around the country before deciding whether or not to run in 2008. In March 2005, his Senate campaign staff registered the domain www.russfeingold08.com, as well as the .org and .net versions. On June 1, 2005, Feingold launched a political action committee (PAC), the Progressive Patriots Fund. A "draft Feingold" movement was established independently of his campaign.

On August 17, 2005, Feingold became the first U.S. Senator of either party to suggest a firm date for American withdrawal from the Iraq War, saying that he favored a complete withdrawal by no later than December 31, 2006.

Feingold supported John Roberts's Supreme Court nomination in September 2005, and was one of three Democrats on the Senate Judiciary Committee to vote in favor of sending the nomination to the floor for a final vote. Feingold graduated from Harvard Law School the same year as Roberts, 1979. Four months later, in January 2006, he voted against Samuel Alito's nomination to the Court in committee and against cloture of debate on the nomination.

Considered a long shot for president, Feingold announced in November 2006 that he would not seek his party's nomination in 2008. He said that a presidential campaign would detract from his focus on the Senate, and the resulting scrutiny "would dismantle both my professional life (in the Senate) and my personal life." In his parting comments he warned his supporters against supporting anyone for the presidency who voted for the Iraq War, whether they later regretted it or not, saying his first choice for president in 2008 was someone who voted against the war, and his second choice is someone who was not in Congress but spoke out against the war at the time.

On February 22, 2008, he said he had voted for Obama in Wisconsin's Democratic presidential primary election.

Post-congressional career 
Following his 2010 defeat, Feingold was appointed a visiting professor at Marquette University Law School. He wrote a book titled While America Sleeps: A Wake-Up Call to the Post-9/11 World, and supported Obama's reelection in 2012. In February 2012, it was announced that Feingold would be a co-chair of Obama's reelection campaign. In 2012, he was the Mimi and Peter E. Haas Distinguished Visitor at Stanford Law School. In 2012-13, he was the Stephen Edward Scarff Distinguished Visiting Professor at Lawrence University.

In February 2011, Feingold formed Progressives United, a Political Action Committee, and an affiliated nonprofit entity called Progressives United Inc. Progressives United's stated aim was "directly and indirectly supporting candidates who stand up for our progressive ideals." From 2011 to 2015, the two groups raised and spent $10 million. The PAC has helped raise money for more than 50 progressive candidates, including the largest beneficiary, then-candidate Elizabeth Warren, who successfully defeated incumbent Scott Brown in 2012. Progressives United Inc. shut down in late 2014, and the Progressives United PAC suspended its fundraising activities in May 2015 in order to avoid the appearance of a conflict of interest with Feingold's 2016 Senate campaign.

On June 18, 2013, Feingold was appointed United States Special Representative for the African Great Lakes region and the Democratic Republic of the Congo by United States Secretary of State John Kerry. He announced his departure from the position on February 24, 2015.

In November 2019, Feingold became a member of the ReFormers Caucus of Issue One.

In February 2020, Feingold was named president of the American Constitution Society.

Personal life
Feingold resides in Middleton, Wisconsin. He is a member of Beth Hillel Temple in Kenosha, Wisconsin, where his sister, Dena Feingold, is rabbi.

Feingold was married to Sue Levine from 1977 until 1986. They had two children. He married Mary Speerschneider in 1991; in 2005, the couple announced they would divorce. In 2013, Feingold married Dr. Christine Ferdinand, a fellow at Magdalen College at Oxford University in England.

In 2011, Feingold received a Freedom Medal from the Roosevelt Institute.

Electoral history

*Write-in and minor candidate notes: In 1992, Robert L. Kundert received 2,747 votes, Joseph Selliken received 2,733 votes, and other write-ins received 459 votes. In 1998, write-ins received 706 votes. In 2004, write-ins received 834 votes.

Further reading

See also
 List of Jewish members of the United States Congress

References

External links

 
 Progressives United (archived)
 
 
 
 

|-

 
|-

|-

|-

|-

1953 births
Alumni of Magdalen College, Oxford
Obama administration personnel
American people of Russian-Jewish descent
American Rhodes Scholars
Democratic Party United States senators from Wisconsin
Harvard Law School alumni
Jewish United States senators
Living people
Lawrence University faculty
Marquette University faculty
Politicians from Janesville, Wisconsin
Stanford University fellows
United States Department of State officials
University of Wisconsin–Madison alumni
Wisconsin lawyers
Democratic Party Wisconsin state senators
21st-century American politicians
People from Middleton, Wisconsin
Jewish American state legislators in Wisconsin
Liberalism in the United States
United States Special Envoys
Joseph A. Craig High School alumni
Candidates in the 2016 United States Senate elections